Krilić is a surname. Notable people with the surname include:
Elvidin Krilić (born 1962), Bosnian musician
Zlatko Krilić (born 1955), Croatian children's writer